Streptomyces vinaceus is a bacterium species from the genus of Streptomyces. Streptomyces vinaceus produces vitamin B12, viomycin, amicetin and citreamycin delta.

Further reading

See also 
 List of Streptomyces species

References

External links
Type strain of Streptomyces vinaceus at BacDive -  the Bacterial Diversity Metadatabase

vinaceus
Bacteria described in 1952